The James Beard Foundation since 1998 has named multiple restaurants one of America's Classics. The award focuses on family-owned restaurants across the country that have been open for at least a decade. According to the Washington Post the awards are given to restaurants “with timeless appeal, each beloved in its region for quality food that reflects the character of its community.” The award has been referred to as the Oscars of the food world.

NPR called the award category "sneakily subversive". The awards in the early years were primarily given to restaurants featuring cuisines familiar to most Americans, but by the late 2010s were including cuisines not widely considered to be part of the typical American diet. 

Awardees were also initially limited to restaurants with menu items below a certain cap, but that was relaxed. The award was initially called the Regional Classics.

References 

American cuisine-related lists